Bad Eilsen (West Low German: Ahlsen) is a municipality in the district of Schaumburg, in Lower Saxony, Germany.

Bad Eilsen is also the seat of the Samtgemeinde ("collective municipality") Eilsen.

History
After World War II, Bad Eilsen hosted the headquarters of the Royal Air Force (British Air Force of Occupation) in the British Zone of Occupation until the opening of JHQ Rheindahlen in 1954. The HQ was served by the airfield at RAF Bückeburg (now Bückeburg Air Base), which also served the nearby HQ of the British Army of the Rhine in Bad Oeynhausen.

References

External links
Bad Eilsen Reunion

Schaumburg
Principality of Schaumburg-Lippe
Spa towns in Germany